Easmon is a patronymic surname of English origin and is a variation of the surname Eastman. The surname is typically ascribed to a notable medical dynasty of Sierra Leone Creole descent. Notable people with the surname include:

Albert Whiggs Easmon (1865–1923), Sierra Leonean doctor, half-brother of Dr John Farrell Easmon
Charles Odamtten Easmon, F.R.C.S. (1913–1994), first Ghanaian surgeon and pioneer of cardiac surgery in West Africa
Charles Syrett Farrell Easmon, CBE, MD, PhD, MRCP, FRCPath, FMedSci, (born 1946), British microbiologist and medical professor
John Farrell Easmon, M.R.C.S. L.M., L.K.Q.C.P., M.D., CMO, (1856–1900), prominent Sierra Leonean Creole doctor, Chief Medical Officer of the Gold Coast during the 1890
Kathleen Mary Easmon Simango (died 1924), Sierra Leonean missionary and artist who was the first West African to earn a diploma from the Royal College of Arts
McCormack Easmon, OBE (1890–1972), physician from Accra, son of John Farrell Easmon
Raymond Sarif Easmon (1913–1997), Sierra Leonean doctor known for his literary work and political agitation

Surnames of English origin
Patronymic surnames
Easmon family (Sierra Leone)